Solna centrum is a shopping mall and metro station in Solna Municipality, approximately  from central Stockholm, Sweden. It is close to the Friends Arena and opened on 31 August 1975 as part the first stretch of the Blue Line between T-Centralen and Hjulsta. The mall contains around 120 stores and restaurants, 40 offices and 214 apartments.

References

External links 

Images of Solna Centrum
http://www.solnacentrum.se/

Blue line (Stockholm metro) stations
Railway stations opened in 1975
1975 establishments in Sweden